AFL Women's season seven was the seventh season of the AFL Women's competition, the highest-level senior women's Australian rules football competition in Australia. The season began on 25 August and ran until 27 November, and was the second AFL Women's season to take place in the 2022 calendar year. The season was the first to feature 18 clubs, an increase from 14 the previous season, and the first to have an August start date.

The season comprised ten home-and-away rounds, just as the previous season was scheduled to before it was impacted by the COVID-19 pandemic, and a four-week finals series featuring the top eight clubs, like in the Australian Football League (AFL), took place for the first time.  won its first AFL Women's premiership, defeating  by four points in the AFL Women's season seven Grand Final, played at Brighton Homes Arena.

Background

In August 2021,  and  – the four Australian Football League (AFL) clubs yet to receive an AFLW licence at the time – were granted licences to join the AFL Women's competition in what was then slated to be a 2022–23 season, meaning all 18 clubs would have an AFLW team for the first time. In May 2022, a one-year bridging collective bargaining agreement (CBA) was announced which would see the competition's seventh season begin during the AFL pre-finals bye in the last weekend of August and conclude with the grand final in the last weekend of November. The CBA also saw player payments rise by 94% across all four payment tiers, with eight players per club occupying the top two tiers and the minimum (tier 4) wage increasing from $20,239 to $39,184. Later in May, AFL head of women's football Nicole Livingstone revealed that the season would be named AFLW season seven, in a deviation from previous seasons.

The season seven fixture was announced in early July. Match times on Saturdays in September (except 24 September, the date of the AFL Grand Final) were floating to maximise doubleheader opportunities, and the final round was released as a floating fixture to be determined later in the season, like in the AFL; the round 10 fixture was eventually announced in early October.

Season seven's Indigenous Round was launched in early September, and was played across rounds 3 and 4. The round is held to acknowledge the significant contribution of Aboriginal and Torres Strait Islander women and girls to Australian football and the broader community. Aunty Pam Pederson, the youngest daughter of Sir Douglas Nicholls, was announced as the round's honouree, and all 18 teams wore specially-designed guernseys across the two weeks. Melbourne rebranded itself as the Narrm Football Club for Indigenous Round, as it did during the corresponding round of the AFL season; Narrm is the traditional name for Melbourne in the Woiwurrung language. Pride Round, which was played in round 8, was launched in early October. The round is held "to promote and support diversity and inclusion of LGBTQI+ communities and families, and acknowledges the AFL's journey to being a more inclusive sport"; this season's iteration also celebrated allies of LGBTQI+ people within the sport. Like with Indigenous Round, all 18 teams wore specially-designed guernseys for the occasion.

The season featured ten home-and-away rounds, the same as the previous season, and a four-week finals series, up from three weeks the previous season; the finals were contested by the top eight teams, up from six the previous season, and the finals system was the same as the AFL's. Melbourne won its first AFL Women's premiership, defeating Brisbane by four points in the grand final, played at Brighton Homes Arena. All matches throughout season seven were broadcast live on the Seven Network and Fox Footy, and could be streamed via Kayo, womens.afl and the official AFL and AFLW apps.

Coach appointments

Club leadership

Home-and-away season
All starting times are local time. Sources: womens.afl (fixture and results), Australian Football (crowd figures)

Round 1

Round 2

Round 3

Round 4

Round 5

Round 6

Round 7

Round 8

Round 9

Round 10

Ladder

Progression by round

Source: Australian Football

Home matches and membership

Source: Australian Football

Finals series

All starting times are local time. Sources: womens.afl (fixture and results), Australian Football (crowd figures)

Finals week 1

Finals week 2

Finals week 3

Grand final

Win/loss table
The following table can be sorted from biggest winning margin to biggest losing margin for each round. If two or more matches in a round are decided by the same margin, these margins are sorted by percentage (i.e. the lowest-scoring winning team is ranked highest and the lowest-scoring losing team is ranked lowest). Home matches are in bold, and opponents are listed above the margins.

Source: Australian Football

Season notes

 Brisbane kicked 33 goals across the first three rounds of the season, an AFLW record, and became the first AFLW team to score more than 200 points across the first three rounds of a season.
 Four teams recorded scores of 0.1 (1), the lowest score in AFLW history, during the season: Fremantle in round 2 against Geelong, Greater Western Sydney in round 5 against Adelaide, Sydney in round 6 against North Melbourne and West Coast in round 10 against Melbourne.
 Brisbane won the minor premiership by the closest practical margin, finishing above Melbourne on the ladder by 0.3 percentage points; had Melbourne scored just one more point during the season, it would have won the minor premiership.

Coach departures

Awards

Major awards

 The AFL Women's Grand Final best-on-ground medal was awarded to 's Shannon Campbell, who became the first player to win the award in a losing team.
 The AFL Women's best and fairest was awarded to Brisbane's Ally Anderson.
 The AFLPA most valuable player was awarded to 's Monique Conti;  captain Chelsea Randall was voted as best captain and most courageous player, while Richmond's Eilish Sheerin was voted as best first-year player.
 The AFLCA AFLW champion player of the year was awarded to 's Jasmine Garner; Brisbane coach Craig Starcevich was voted as coach of the year.
 The AFL Women's All-Australian team was announced on 22 November; Garner was named captain, while Brisbane captain Breanna Koenen was named vice-captain. North Melbourne captain Emma Kearney was selected for the seventh consecutive season. Anderson was not selected, becoming the first AFLW player to win the league best and fairest award but miss All-Australian selection in the same season.
 The AFL Women's leading goalkicker was awarded to Brisbane's Jesse Wardlaw.
 The AFL Women's Rising Star was awarded to 's Hannah Ewings.
 The Goal of the Year was awarded to 's Ashanti Bush.
 The Mark of the Year was awarded to 's Chloe Scheer.

Leading goalkickers

! rowspan=2 style=width:2em | #
! rowspan=2 | Player
! rowspan=2 | Team
! colspan=10 | Home-and-away season(AFL Women's leading goalkicker)
! colspan=4 | Finals
! rowspan=2 | Total
! rowspan=2 | Games
! rowspan=2 | Average
|-
! 1 !! 2 !! 3 !! 4 !! 5 !! 6 !! 7 !! 8 !! 9 !! 10 !! F1 !! F2 !! F3 !! GF
|-
! scope=row style=text-align:center | 1
| align=left | Jesse Wardlaw || align=left |  || 22 || 13 || 47 || bgcolor=C9F0FF | 29 || –9 || bgcolor=C9F0FF | 211 || bgcolor=C9F0FF | 112 || bgcolor=C9F0FF | 214 || bgcolor=C9F0FF | 317 || bgcolor=CCFFCC | 219 || 120 || X20 || 222 || 022 || 22 || 12 || 1.83
|-
! scope=row style=text-align:center | 2
| align=left | Kate Hore || align=left |  || 11 || 01 || 12 || 24 || 15 || 38 || 19 || 211 || 314 || 216 || 016 || X16 || 117 || 017 || 17 || 13 || 1.31
|-
! scope=row style=text-align:center rowspan=3 | 3
| align=left | Courtney Wakefield || align=left |  || 00 || 22 || 13 || 25 || 27 || 07 || 07 || 411 || 112 || 113 || 013 || 114 || colspan=2 |  || 14 || 12 || 1.17
|-
| align=left | Ashleigh Woodland || align=left |  || 33 || 14 || 04 || 15 || 05 || 49 || 211 || 011 || 011 || 213 || 114 || 014 || 014 ||  || 14 || 13 || 1.08
|-
| align=left | Eden Zanker || align=left |  || 11 || 01 || 23 || 14 || 04 || 26 || 28 || 210 || 111 || 213 || 114 || X14 || 014 || 014 || 14 || 13 || 1.08
|-
! scope=row style=text-align:center rowspan=2 | 6
| align=left | Chloe Scheer || align=left |  || 00 || 00 || 00 || 00 || 33 || 14 || 37 || 18 || 19 || 413 || 013 || colspan=3 |  || 13 || 11 || 1.18
|-
| align=left | Kate Shierlaw || align=left |  || bgcolor=C9F0FF | 44 || bgcolor=C9F0FF | 26 || bgcolor=C9F0FF | 28 || bgcolor=C9F0FF | 19 || bgcolor=C9F0FF | 110 || bgcolor=C9F0FF | 111 || 011 || 011 || 112 || 113 || colspan=4 |  || 13 || 10 || 1.30
|-
! scope=row style=text-align:center | 8
| align=left | Tahlia Randall || align=left |  || 33 || 03 || 03 || 03 || 14 || 37 || 07 || 18 || 210 || 010 || 010 || 111 || 112 ||  || 12 || 13 || 0.92
|-
! scope=row style=text-align:center rowspan=5 | 9
| align=left | Greta Bodey || align=left |  || 22 || 24 || 37 || 07 || 07 || 18 || 19 || 110 || 111 || 011 || 011 || X11 || 011 || 011 || 11 || 13 || 0.85
|-
| align=left | Tayla Harris || align=left |  || 11 || 01 || 01 || –1 || 34 || 15 || 27 || 310 || 010 || 010 || 010 || X10 || 010 || 111 || 11 || 12 || 0.92
|-
| align=left | Courtney Hodder || align=left |  || 22 || 13 || 03 || 14 || 04 || 15 || 16 || 17 || 07 || 29 || 09 || X9 || 211 || 011 || 11 || 13 || 0.85
|-
| align=left | Danielle Ponter || align=left |  || 11 || 01 || 23 || –3 || –3 || –3 || 14 || 15 || 27 || 29 || 110 || 010 || 111 ||  || 11 || 10 || 1.10
|-
| align=left | Aine Tighe || align=left |  || 11 || 01 || 12 || 24 || 26 || 17 || 07 || 07 || 07 || 411 || colspan=4 |  || 11 || 10 || 1.10
|}

Source: Australian Football

Club best and fairest

See also
 2022 AFL Women's season
 2022 AFL season

References

Sources
 AFL Women's season seven at womens.afl
 AFL Women's season seven at AustralianFootball.com

AFL Women's season seven
AFL Women's seasons
2022 in Australian rules football